Yoo Wook-Jin (born August 13, 1985) is a South Korean footballer (striker) who last played for Persiram Raja Ampat.

References

External links
Profile at liga-indonesia.co.id
 

1985 births
Association football forwards
Expatriate footballers in Indonesia
Liga 1 (Indonesia) players
Jeju United FC players
K League 1 players
Korea National League players
Living people
South Korean expatriate footballers
South Korean footballers